Kluivert Ferney Roa Núñez (November 3, 2000 – February 24, 2015) was a Venezuelan high school student who was killed during a protest against Venezuelan President Nicolás Maduro  by an officer from the Policía Nacional Bolivariana. The event shocked Venezuela.

Biography
Roa was born in San Cristóbal, in the Andean state of Táchira. He was a high school student at the Instituto Agustín Codazzi.

Death
On February 24, 2015, at the Barrio Obrero of San Cristóbal, during a student protest against Venezuelan President Nicolás Maduro, Roa was shot by Javier Osías Mora, an officer of the Policía Nacional Bolivariana. The bullet struck Roa in the head at the top of his skull. He was immediately sent to the San Cristóbal Central Hospital, but died on the way to the hospital.

The official time of this event was given to the authorities, who designated the case.

Investigation and sentencing
The officer, Javier Mora Ortiz, admitted to the killing shortly after he was arrested. On 9 May 2015, Ortiz was sentenced to 18 years in jail, with the court ruling that he was guilty of murder.

References

2000 births
2015 deaths
People from Táchira
Executed students
Deaths by firearm in Venezuela
Murdered Venezuelan students
People murdered in Venezuela
Filmed killings by law enforcement
People murdered by law enforcement officers
2015 murders in Venezuela
Law enforcement in Venezuela
People shot dead by law enforcement officers
February 2015 crimes in South America